Aamir is a given name, a variant spelling of the Arabic name Amer, common to the cultures of the Indian subcontinent. Notable people with the name include:

Aamir Ageeb (1969–1999), Sudanese political activist
Aamir Uddin Ahmod, politician
Aamir Ali (born 2002), Pakistani cricketer
Aamir Ali, Indian television actor
Aamir Aziz (born 1990), Indian cricketer
Aamir Bashir, Indian actor, film producer, and director
Aamir Gani (born 1996), Indian cricketer
Aamir Ghaffar (born 1979), English badminton player
Aamir Raza Husain (born 1957), Indian theatre actor and director
Aamir Liaquat Hussain (born 1971), former State Minister of Pakistan for religious affairs
Aamir Kaleem (born 1981), Omani cricketer
Aamir Khan (born 1965), Indian actor, film director and producer
Aamir Atlas Khan (born 1990), Pakistani squash player
Aamir Mehmood Kiani, Pakistani politician
Aamir Latif, Afghani politician
Aamir Rashadi Madni, Indian politician
Aamir Peerzada (born 1991), Kashmiri journalist, documentary filmmaker, and author
Aamir Hayat Khan Rokhri (1956–2011), Pakistani politician
Aamir Saleem, Pakistani singer, composer, songwriter, host, and music video director
Aamir J. Sheikh (born 1970), Norwegian-Pakistani politician
Aamir Sheraz, bass guitarist in the Pakistani rock band, Jal
Aamir Simms (born 1999), American basketball player
Aamir Yousuf, Pakistani TV director, producer, writer, and actor
Aamir Zaki (1968–2017), Pakistani guitar player

See also

Amer (name)
Almir (given name)
Amir (disambiguation)
Amir (name)

Masculine given names